Ivan Rodić (born 11 November 1985), is a Croatian football striker, who plays for second-tier side Dugopolje.

External links
 
 Profile at Nogometni-magazin.com 

1985 births
Living people
People from Omiš
Association football forwards
Croatian footballers
NK Primorac 1929 players
NK Mosor players
NK Imotski players
HNK Šibenik players
HNK Hajduk Split players
HNK Rijeka players
NK Istra 1961 players
FC Zorya Luhansk players
FC Hoverla Uzhhorod players
FC Metalist Kharkiv players
FC Atyrau players
FC Arsenal Kyiv players
NK Dugopolje players
Croatian Football League players
Ukrainian Premier League players
Kazakhstan Premier League players
Croatian expatriate footballers
Expatriate footballers in Ukraine
Croatian expatriate sportspeople in Ukraine
Expatriate footballers in Kazakhstan
Croatian expatriate sportspeople in Kazakhstan